Eulachnus is a genus of true bugs belonging to the family Aphididae.

The species of this genus are found in Eurasia and America.

Species:
 Eulachnus agilis (Kaltenbach, 1843) 
 Eulachnus alticola Börner, 1940

References

Aphididae